Joseph Trewavas  (14 December 1835 – 20 July 1905) was a Royal Navy sailor and a recipient of the Victoria Cross, the highest award for gallantry in the face of the enemy that can be awarded to British and Commonwealth forces.

Details
Trewavas was 19 years old, and a seaman in the Royal Navy during the Crimean War when the following deed took place for which he was awarded the VC.

On 3 July 1855 in the Strait of Genitchi, Sea of Azov in the Crimea, Seaman Trewavas of HMS Beagle was sent in a 4-oared gig to destroy a bridge, and so cut the Russians' main supply route. This was the third attempt, the first two having failed. As the gig ground against the bridge, Seaman Trewavas leapt out with an axe and began to hew away at the hawsers holding the pontoons together, and although the enemy kept up a heavy fire, particularly on Trewavas himself, he continued until his task was completed, and the two severed ends of the pontoon began to drift apart. He was wounded as he got back into the gig.

Further information
He later achieved the rank of able seaman. He was a member of Cornwall County Council and a member of the County Fisheries Committee.

The medal
The medal is housed in the Penlee House Gallery & Museum in Penzance. It is generally not on display, but can be seen on appointment.

See also

 List of British recipients of the Légion d'Honneur for the Crimean War
 List of Crimean War Victoria Cross recipients

References

Monuments to Courage (David Harvey, 1999)
The Register of the Victoria Cross (This England, 1997)

External links

 Profile
Location of grave and VC medal (Cornwall)

1835 births
1905 deaths
Burials in Cornwall
People from Mousehole
Members of Cornwall County Council
Crimean War recipients of the Victoria Cross
British recipients of the Victoria Cross
Recipients of the Conspicuous Gallantry Medal
Royal Navy personnel of the Crimean War
Royal Navy sailors
Royal Navy recipients of the Victoria Cross
Chevaliers of the Légion d'honneur